Lina Almind Knudsen (born 17 December 1985 in Uldum) is a Danish curler from Copenhagen. She competed in the 2018 Winter Olympics.

Personal life
Knudsen is a healthcare consultant.

References

1985 births
Living people
Curlers at the 2018 Winter Olympics
Danish female curlers
Olympic curlers of Denmark
Sportspeople from Copenhagen
21st-century Danish women